"When the Last Time" is the second official single from the Clipse's album Lord Willin'. It reached #19 on the Billboard Hot 100 on the issue dated December 21, 2002--becoming the group's highest-charting single. The video features a freestyle from comedian Shawty. At the very end of the music video, the video features a very short video version of the song "Virginia". Kelis and Pharrell Williams appear uncredited.

Charts

Weekly charts

Year-end charts

References

External links
 Music video on YouTube

2002 singles
2002 songs
Clipse songs
Kelis songs
Arista Records singles
Song recordings produced by the Neptunes
Songs written by Pusha T
Songs written by Pharrell Williams
Songs written by Chad Hugo